Out of the box primarily refers to:
 Out of the box (feature), a product that is usable immediately
 Thinking out of the box, or thinking outside the box, a metaphor for thinking in a creative way

Out of the Box may also refer to:
 
 Out of the Box (Jade Valerie album), 2007
 Out of the Box (Joel Turner album), 2007
 Out of the Box (TV series), Playhouse Disney show
 Out of the Box Publishing, a publisher of board and card games

See also
 Strait Out of the Box, an album by George Strait
 Off-the-shelf (disambiguation)
 Outside the Box (disambiguation)